The 2018 Four Nations Tournament was the 17th edition of the Four Nations Tournament, an invitational women's football tournament held annually in China.

Teams

Venues

Standings

Matches
All times are local (UTC+08:00).

References 

2018 in women's association football
2018
2018 in Chinese football
January 2018 sports events in China